R. lutea may refer to:

 Reseda lutea, a herbaceous plant
 Retama lutea, a flowering bush
 Rhagonycha lutea, a soldier beetle
 Rhexia lutea, a dicotyledonous plant
 Rhingia lutea, a hoverfly with a long snout
 Rhipidarctia lutea, a Congolese moth
 Rosa lutea, a rose native to Georgia
 Roscoea lutea, a perennial plant
 Russula lutea, an edible mushroom